The Green Weenie was a sports gimmick in Pittsburgh, Pennsylvania, co-created by Bob Prince (1916–1985), the broadcaster for the Pittsburgh Pirates Major League Baseball team, and Pirate trainer Danny Whelan. It was most popular during the 1966 season. The Green Weenie was manufactured by Tri-State Plastics, a Pittsburgh plastic thermoforming company between 1967 and 1974 and during the 1989 season.

The Green Weenie was a green plastic rattle in the shape of a hot dog, which, when waved at opposing players, purportedly put a jinx on them. Conversely, when waved at Pirate players it allegedly bestowed good luck. In September, the H.J. Heinz Co. offered a  inflatable version for one dollar.

The superstition began during a 1966 game against the Houston Astros, when Whelan shouted from the dugout at Astros' pitcher Dave Giusti, "You're gonna walk him!" while waving a green rubber hot dog in the direction of the pitcher's mound. Giusti did walk the batter, and the Astros lost the game. During the next game's broadcast, Prince quizzed Whelan about the frankfurter incident, and the gimmick was born. Within weeks, Green Weenies were being sold to fans at Forbes Field.

Writer Dave Cole has noted that Roberto Clemente did win that year's National League MVP Award, Matty Alou won the National League batting title, Bill Mazeroski led the league in double plays, and Willie Stargell had his personal best year in batting.

According to the August 12, 1966 issue of  Time magazine, however, the hex of the Green Weenie sometimes seemed to work: "When the Pirates played the Giants two weeks ago, Prince pointed a Weenie at Juan Marichal. Marichal won the game, 2–1, but next day he caught the third finger of his pitching hand in a car door and missed two scheduled turns on the mound. In Pittsburgh, the Pirates were trailing the Philadelphia Phillies 3–1 in the seventh inning when Prince's fellow announcer Don Hoak begged Bob to use the Weenie. 'Not yet,' said Prince. In the eighth inning, with Pittsburgh still behind by two runs, Prince finally waved the Weenie. The Pirates scored four runs and won the game 5–3. 'Remember,' said Prince to Hoak. 'Never waste the power of the Green Weenie.

The Green Weenie was revived several times during subsequent seasons, but failed to stay popular with fans.

In 1974, Prince invented another talisman, encouraging female fans to spark a Pirates rally by waving their babushkas (folded kerchiefs used as head coverings, especially by East European women, a large immigrant minority in Pittsburgh). "Babushka Power", as it was called, most likely inspired the Terrible Towel, another sports gimmick created a year later by sportscaster Myron Cope for the Pittsburgh Steelers, the city's football team. The Terrible Towel has remained popular with Steeler fans for over thirty years.

References

External links
The Terrible Blogger – Bob Prince – The Green Weenie & Babushka Power

Pittsburgh Pirates
Sports paraphernalia